Park Jie-won(born 5 June 1942) is a South Korean politician who served as Director of the National Intelligence Service. He was the chief presidential secretary to President Kim Dae-jung, and served as the Minister of Ministry of Culture, Sports and Tourism and coined the term "Esports" during his administration. On 9 April 2008, he was elected as a member of 18th National Assembly of South Korea for Mokpo as an independent. After being elected, he returned to the Democratic party. In May 2012, he became the floor leader for the Democratic United Party.

In 2018, he declared that he would leave People's Party and joined to the Party for Democracy and Peace.

Early life and education 
Park Jie-won attended Moontae High School in Mokpo and graduated in 1960. Park studied business in Dankook University and graduated in 1969. Park joined Lucky Goldstar (now LG) in 1970.

Life in the United States 
Park Jie-won immigrated to the United States in 1972, and became popular among the expat Korean community. He was elected to become the 16th President of the Korean American Association of Greater New York and subsequently became the 4th President of the Federation of Korean Associations, USA.

Scandal 
Park Jie-won was charged with abusing his power and violating domestic laws on foreign exchange trade and inter-Korean cooperation affairs while orchestrating covert money transfers by Hyundai to North Korea. He played a pivotal role in arranging the first Inter-Korean summit between South and North Korean leader in June 2000. Hyundai transferred $500 million to the North just months before the summit, triggering criticism that S.Korean Government paid for the summit. Hyundai claimed the money was a payment for exclusive business rights in electric power facilities, communication lines, an industrial park, cross-border roads and railway lines in North Korea. In May 2006, he was sentenced to three years in prison. Park was released in February 2007, and subsequently pardoned in December 2007, which enabled him to run for a legislative election in April 2008. He was defeated in the 2020 election and lost his seat.

Director of the National Intelligence Service 
On 3 July 2020, Park was nominated the Director of the National Intelligence Service. He was finally appointed to the position on 28 July. In December 2020, the Moon administration subsequently passed a reform bill to remove the NIS's involvement in domestic intelligence and activities and transferring of such powers to the National Police Agency. Park, on behalf of the NIS, proclaimed that the agency would never meddle in domestic politics again.

See also 
 Cash-for-summit scandal

References 

|-

|-

1942 births
Minjoo Party of Korea politicians
Living people
Members of the National Assembly (South Korea)
South Korean Roman Catholics
People from South Jeolla Province
Dankook University alumni
Government ministers of South Korea
People's Party (South Korea, 2016) politicians
South Korean politicians with disabilities
Directors of the National Intelligence Service (South Korea)
Chiefs of Staff to the President of South Korea